Luca Novac (15 September 1941 – 15 February 2021) was a Romanian musician.

Biography
Novac was born into a family of musicians in the village of Var in Severin County in the Kingdom of Romania. He played multiple instruments, such as the clarinet, bagpipe, saxophone, and ocarina, but his favorite was the tárogató. He joined the Orchestrei Populare de Stat ”Lazăr Cernescu”, which was located in Caransebeș, in 1964. There, he made his first recordings on radio and television.

After his time in Caransebeș, he moved to Timișoara to join the Ansamblul Profesionist „Banatul” . From there, he would perform Romanian music abroad in China, South Korea, Mongolia, and the Soviet Union. He also performed with the band Radu Simion and recorded songs such as Doina oilor, Doiul lui Luca Novac, Doiul gugulanilor, and Hora de la Oravița.

Luca Novac died in Timișoara on 15 February 2021 at the age of 79.

Discography

Mini-Discs
Luca Novac și Petrică Vasile (1966, 1967)

Albums
Trésors folkloriques roumains: un virtuose du taragote (1977)
În memoria lui Luță Ioviță (1983)
Luca Novac și Carmen Luca - Vai de cel care iubește (1994)

Audio Cassettes
Luca Novac și Carmen Luca - Vai de cel care iubește (1994)
Luca și Gheza Novac - Doine și jocuri bănățene (1990s)

CDs
Trésors folkloriques roumains: un virtuose du taragote (1997)
Luca Novac și Carmen Luca

Distinctions
Knight of the National Order of Merit (2004)

References

People from Caraș-Severin County
1941 births
2021 deaths
Romanian multi-instrumentalists
Romanian folk musicians